Cry, Onion! (lit. "Onion Colt", also known as The Smell of Onion) is a 1975  Spaghetti Western comedy film directed by Enzo G. Castellari. It is openly comedic and parodic.

Cast

Release
Cry, Onion! was released in Italy on 25 August 1975.

Trivia 

The film was broadcast on Tele 5 as part of the programme format SchleFaZ in season 2.

References

External links

1975 films
1970s Western (genre) comedy films
Films directed by Enzo G. Castellari
1970s parody films
Italian parody films
Spaghetti Western films
Films scored by Guido & Maurizio De Angelis
Films with screenplays by Luciano Vincenzoni
Films with screenplays by Sergio Donati
Works about petroleum
Films shot in Almería
1975 comedy films
Films produced by Zev Braun
1970s Italian-language films
1970s Italian films